The term Fenestration Testing Laboratory (when used with an architectural meaning and/or in regards to a building envelope) refers to either an individual test facility or the collective group of independent testing laboratories that have been inspected and accredited by nationally and internationally recognized governing bodies to perform fenestration test standards.  

The word fenestration itself is a derivative of the Latin word Fenestra, which means window. Through the progression of time, the word fenestration has come to be used and accepted by architects, builders, and engineers as a technical term referring to windows, doors, and other types of openings in a building or wall envelope.

Product Performance Testing
These labs conduct tests according to many nationally recognized test standards developed by:AAMA, ASTM, NFRC, and WDMA
Performance testing includes but is not limited to: Operating Force, Air Infiltration, Water Penetration, Structural Wind Loads, Thermal Simulations, and Forced Entry Resistance.

Test Methods, Guidelines, and Standards
Title 24, Section 116 (Air Leakage Testing)
ASTM E783 Field measurement of air leakage through installed exterior windows and doors.
ASTM E1105:  Field determination of water penetration of installed exterior windows and doors.
AAMA 501.2 Quality assurance and diagnostic water leakage field check of installed storefronts, curtain walls, and sloped glazing systems.

External links
The American Architectural Manufacturers Association (AAMA)
ASTM International (ASTM)
The International Accreditation Service (IAS)
The Window and Door Manufacturers Association (WDMA)

Windows
Doors